Mark Wischnitzer (May 10, 1882 – October 15, 1955) was a scholar of Jewish history.

Biography
Mark Wischnitzer was born on May 10, 1882, in Rovno, Russia. He studied at the University of Vienna and University of Berlin, and he received his doctorate in 1906. Wischnitzer served as editor of the history section of the Russian-language Jewish Encyclopedia from 1908 to 1913, and later as the editor of the Encyclopaedia Judaica published in Berlin. He moved to Berlin, Germany, in 1921. There he served as Secretary General of the Hilfsverein der Deutschen Juden until his immigration to France in 1938. In Paris from 1938 to 1940, he was a research associate of the American Jewish Joint Distribution Committee. Wischnitzer immigrated to the United States in 1941. From 1941 to 1949, he was a research associate for the Council of Jewish Federations and Welfare Funds. Starting in 1948, he was on the faculty of Yeshiva University as professor of Jewish history in the graduate school. 

Mark Wischnitzer died on October 15, 1955, in Tel Aviv, Israel, of a heart attack. He was married to art historian Rachel Wischnitzer. They had one son, Leonard James.

Books

 Die Universität Göttingen und die Entwicklung der liberalen Ideen in Russland im ersten Viertel des 19. Jahrhunderts, Berlin: Ebering, 1907
 Die jüdische Zunftverfassung in Polen un Litauen im 17. une 18. Jahrhundert, Stuttgart: W. Kohlhammer, 1927
 Die Juden in der Welt: Gegenwart und Geschichte des Judentums in allen Ländern, Berlin: Reiss, 1935
 To dwell in safety: the story of Jewish migration since 1800, Philadelphia: Jewish Publication Society of America, 1949
 Visas to freedom: the history of HIAS, Cleveland: World Pub. Co., 1956

References

External links
Mark Wischnitzer Papers at YIVO.
Milgroim : Zeitschrift für Kunst und Literatur (q N 8 M5), a digitized periodical published by Mark Wischnitzer and his wife, at the Leo Baeck Institute, New York

1882 births
1955 deaths
Humboldt University of Berlin alumni
Jewish historians
Jewish scholars
University of Vienna alumni
Yeshiva University faculty